Stadion Gersag is a stadium in Emmenbrücke, Luzern, Switzerland.  It is currently used for football matches and is the home ground of FC Emmenbrücke. The stadium has 3,195 covered seats and 4,785 standing places. It is the home stadium of FC Emmenbrücke and from 2009-2011 has been the temporary stadium of FC Luzern whilst their home stadium, the Swissporarena, is built.

FC Luzern supporters enjoyed their time in the stadium, even naming it as the 5th best thing about supporting the club and so have made a scarf as a tribute to their time there.

There has been talk of Grasshopper Club Zürich moving into the Gersag stadium as they seek a home for the 2011-12 season. GC current pay 2.7 million CHF and would find the 570,000CHF rent that FCL currently pay to be a more attractive price.

External links
http://justcantbeatthat.com/2011/the-new-allmend-stadium/
http://www.sportmapworld.com/team/soccer/switzerland/luzern/

References

Gersag
FC Luzern